Resala, also known as Resala Association, is a non-profit organization based in Egypt.

History and profile
Resala was established in 1999 as a youth movement at Cairo University; Sherif Abd Al Azim, an engineering professor, supervised the movement.

It is powered by over 1,500,000 volunteers spanning 67 branches all over Egypt. It provides 31 activities aimed at helping the Egyptian community. These activities include: caring for orphans; helping the blind, the deaf, and children with special needs; blood donations; poverty alleviation; and literacy training.

Activities
 Orphans care: Each branch raises around 25 orphans or less, providing them with care and big siblings through the BBBS activity, with the possibility of being adopted.
 Blind care: In addition to helping thousands of blind people in need, many books are being printed in Braille, recorded in cassettes and read to the orphans by thousands of volunteers. Through Resala, many of them have received their Master's degree and PHDs.
 Deaf/mutes care: Provides them with computer courses, religious principles, art workshops, medical aids and job opportunities; also organises trips and parties.
 Special abilities care
 Aiding needy homes and families
 Organizing second-hand clothes fairs
 Free tutoring
 Blood bank or life-saving activity aims to spread blood donation culture in Egypt with 50K on call emergency donor and regular organized blood donation campaigns supplying safe blood transfusion to different patients especially the Thalassemia group which is covered by constant and regular “kafala” donors for their case.
 Recycling
 Training centers (literacy/computers/languages)
 Medical care
 Street kids care
 Caravans
 Charity errands
 Charity visits
 Handiwork
 Advertising
 Sales
 Anwar Resala
 Forsan Resala
 Ensan Awareness

References

External links
 Official website

1999 establishments in Egypt
Organizations established in 1999
Non-profit organisations based in Egypt
Deafness charities
Blindness charities
Cairo University